Kota Aadhayya, professionally known as Hyper Aadi, is an Indian actor and television presenter who appears in Telugu films and television. He was born in Pallamalla Village, Chimakurthy Mandal near to Ongole City. He is known for his appearance in the television comedy show Jabardasth.

Career 
Aadi started his career working for an engineering job after completing his B. Tech. He later quit his job and started acting on television after being spotted in a short film. He is known for his work on the TV show Jabardasth. His skits, sarcastic jokes, and drawings earned him the name 'Hyper' Aadi and subsequently earned him the chance to perform in films starting with Rarandoi Veduka Chudham.

Filmography

Television 
 Jabardasth (2015–2022)
 Sridevi Drama Company' (2020 - present)
 Dhee Ultimate Dance Show'' (2019 - present)

References

External links
 

Indian male film actors
Living people
21st-century Indian male actors
Male actors in Telugu cinema
Male actors in Telugu television
Indian male comedians
Male actors from Andhra Pradesh
Year of birth missing (living people)
People from Ongole